Sachin Pilot  (born 7 September 1977) is an Indian politician of Indian National Congress. Earlier he served as the MoS (Independent charge) Corporate Affairs  & MoS Communication & IT, Government of India, Deputy Chief Minister of Rajasthan and also President of the Rajasthan Pradesh Congress Committee. As Member of the Congress party, he has represented the Tonk assembly seat in Rajasthan since 2018. Pilot became the youngest citizen of India to become Member of Parliament.

Pilot was previously a member of the Indian Parliament for the Ajmer in 2009 and Dausa constituencies of Rajasthan, becoming the youngest member of parliament when he was elected from the latter seat in 2004, aged 26. He was unseated from the Lok Sabha during the 2014 election from Ajmer constituency. He served as the Minister of Corporate Affairs in the second Manmohan Singh Ministry.

Early life 
Pilot was born to late Congress leader Rajesh Pilot and Rama Pilot. His father was a Union minister of India. His ancestral village is Vaidpura in Noida, Uttar Pradesh.

He studied at Air Force Bal Bharati School, New Delhi, and holds a B.A. from St. Stephens College, University of Delhi, a diploma in marketing from I.M.T. Ghaziabad and an MBA from the Wharton School of the University of Pennsylvania, Philadelphia, USA. He was employed with the Delhi Bureau of the British Broadcasting Corporation, and then with American multinational corporation General Motors for two years.

Electoral history

Career 

In the 2004 Lok Sabha elections, Pilot was elected from the Dausa constituency. At the age of 26, he became the youngest MP in India.

In the 2009 Lok Sabha elections, he defeated the Bharatiya Janata Party's Kiran Maheshwari by a margin of 76,596 votes and won the seat of Ajmer.

Pilot was a member of the Lok Sabha's Standing Committee on Home Affairs and member of the Consultative Committee in the Ministry of Civil Aviation.
In 2012, he became the Minister of Corporate Affairs in the second Manmohan Singh ministry.

In the 2014 Lok Sabha elections, he was again nominated from the Ajmer constituency and was defeated by a margin of 1,71,983 votes by Bharatiya Janata Party's sitting MLA Sanwarlal Jat.

In 2014, he was appointed the President of the Rajasthan Pradesh Congress Committee.

Deputy Chief Minister of Rajasthan

Early times 
In the 2018 Legislative Assembly elections, Pilot won from the Tonk seat, after defeating Yunus Khan by a margin of 54,179 votes. It was speculated that Pilot, who was considered instrumental in the Congress's victory in the state, would be given the post of chief minister. On 17 December 2018, he was sworn in as Deputy chief Minister of Rajasthan under Ashok Gehlot.

2020 Political crisis 

On 13 July 2020, Pilot's office issued a statement saying that the government of chief minister Ashok Gehlot was in a minority. An aide of Pilot's indicated that he would not be joining the Bharatiya Janata Party.

On 14 July 2020, the Indian National Congress sacked Pilot as the Deputy Chief Minister and Rajasthan Congress President for his revolt against the party and its leadership.

After his revolt there was speculation that he would join the BJP, like his former colleague Jyotiraditya Scindia, but on 15 July 2020 he rejected the rumours and stated: "I am still a member of the Congress party".

The Rajasthan Speaker, C.P. Joshi, issued notices to 19 dissident Congress MLAs including Pilot on 14 July 2020 after the Rajasthan Congress passed a resolution that they be disqualified from the state Assembly as they had defied a party whip to attend two Congress Legislature Party meetings. Pilot challenged this notice in the Rajasthan High Court on 17 July 2020. The High Court asked the Speaker to defer action on disqualification notices till 21 July 2020.

Personal life 
Pilot married Sara Abdullah on 15 January 2004. She is the daughter of Farooq Abdullah, chairman of Jammu & Kashmir National Conference and ex-Chief Minister of Jammu and Kashmir. Together they have two sons, Aaran and Vehaan.

His father, Rajesh Pilot, was also member of parliament and was also union minister.

Army service
On 6 September 2012, Pilot became the first Union minister of India to be commissioned as an officer in the Territorial Army, fulfilling his desire to follow his father's footsteps to be in the armed forces.  He is known as Captain Pilot for being an officer in the Territorial Army. After being commissioned he said, "This has been my desire to join the army for very long as I wanted to have my links with the armed forces, like my father and grandfather. I am honoured to be part of this family."

Books published
 Rajesh Pilot: In Spirit Forever, co-authored with sister Sarika Pilot.

References

External links

  profile on Lok Sabha site
 
 
 

|-

|-

|-

1977 births
Living people
St. Stephen's College, Delhi alumni
Delhi University alumni
Institute of Management Technology, Ghaziabad alumni
University of Pennsylvania alumni
Wharton School of the University of Pennsylvania alumni
Indian National Congress politicians from Rajasthan
Rajasthani politicians
Rajasthan MLAs 2018–2023
India MPs 2004–2009
India MPs 2009–2014
Lok Sabha members from Rajasthan
Union ministers of state of India with independent charge
United Progressive Alliance candidates in the 2014 Indian general election
People from Saharanpur
People from Dausa district
Deputy chief ministers of Rajasthan
Ministers for Corporate Affairs
Indian Hindus
People named in the Paradise Papers